Step 3 is the final exam in the USMLE series of examinations.  It is part of the licensing requirements for Doctors of Medicine (M.D.), including international medical graduates aiming to practice medicine in the United States. Generally, it is a pre-requisite of the majority of the state licensing boards.

Most of the USMLE Step 3 exam (75 percent) consists of multiple choice questions, while the remaining 25 percent are clinical case simulations.  A full description of the content of the exam can be found on the USMLE website. USMLE Step 3 exams are delivered online but administered only at Prometric testing centers, which emphasize identity verification and security. Examinees must provide official photo identification and fingerprints as well as pass both metal detector and physical inspection every time they wish to enter the examination room. Materials allowed within the exam room are extremely limited and most require prior approval, including medical equipment. Examinees are on video surveillance during the examination. The test is available throughout the year to the examinees.

Since 2014 USMLE Step 3 can be taken on two non-consecutive days, instead of two consecutive days.

Examination content
USMLE Step 3 examination tests on general topics that are required to understand and practice concepts of general medicine/ family medicine.

The following components are tested:

Normal conditions and disease categories (normal growth and development, basic concepts, and general principles)
Clinical encounter frame (initial work up, continuing care, urgent intervention)
Physician task (applying scientific concepts, formulating a diagnosis based on history, physical exam, and lab findings, and managing the patient).

Clinical encounter frames are common clinical scenarios physicians may encounter. They range from nonemergency problems, to the continuity of care, to life-threatening emergency situations encountered in emergency departments, clinics, offices, care facilities, inpatient settings, and on the telephone. Each test item, in an encounter frame, represents one of the six physician tasks. For example, initial care encounters emphasize taking a history and performing a physical examination. In contrast, continued care encounters emphasize decisions regarding prognosis and management.

Day 1 (Foundations of Independent Practice [FIP]) is divided into six 60-minute blocks. Each FIP block has 38 to 39 multiple-choice questions (MCQs). As of 2022, the total number of MCQs on the FIP portion of the examination is 232. The total testing day will be approximately 7 hours.

Day 2 (Advanced Clinical Medicine [ACM]) is divided into six 45-minute blocks of MCQs, and 13 computer-based case simulations (CCS). Each ACM MCQ block includes 30 items.

Eligibility for USMLE Step 3
To be eligible to take the USMLE Step 3 exam, the physician must:

 Pass the USMLE Step 1 and Step 2 Clinical Knowledge exams. 
 Hold a medical degree. International medical graduates (IMGs) must also obtain certification by the Educational Commission for Foreign Medical Graduates (ECFMG).
 Fulfil all requirements in the USMLE Bulletin of Information

Scoring
Beginning January 1, 2020 the recommended Step 3 minimum passing score was raised from 196 to 198.

Pass rates
First-time USMLE pass rates for D.O. and M.D. students in 2020 were 91 percent and 98 percent, respectively. The first-time pass rate for students from schools outside of the United States and Canada was 90 percent. Trainees in fields which encompass multiple specialties, such as emergency medicine or internal medicine, tend to perform well on Step 3 regardless of when they take the exam; trainees in other fields tend to do better if they take the exam shortly after medical school.

References

Medical education in the United States
United States Medical Licensing Examination